The John Rushing Farm is a historic farm with a main house and several buildings in Camden, Tennessee, U.S..

The main house was built in 1900. It was purchased by John Rushing and his wife, née Myrtle McRae, in 1915. Rushing purchased it with several buildings, including a house for African-American tenants.

The main house was designed in the Colonial Revival architectural style. It was listed on the National Register of Historic Places in 1999, and was delisted in 2022.

References

National Register of Historic Places in Benton County, Tennessee
Colonial Revival architecture in Tennessee
Houses completed in 1900
Former National Register of Historic Places in Tennessee